Associazione Calcio Dilettantistica Legnano, commonly referred to as Legnano, is an Italian football club based in Legnano, Lombardy.
Founded in 1913, Legnano played three seasons in Serie A and a total of eleven seasons in the top tier of the Italian football league system.

Legnano's most recent appearance in Serie A dates back to 1954, whereas in 1957 the club took part for the last time – to date – in a Serie B championship (the second tier of Italian football).
Since then the club have played at their highest at the third tier of the Italian league.

The team's colours are lilac and white.
After financial struggles and bankruptcy in 2010 the club folded and reformed in 2011 as ASD Legnano Calcio 1913; in 2015 they regained the right to name themselves ACD Legnano Calcio and to merge their history with the one of the 97-year-old club previously folded.

History

Foundation
The club were founded in 1913 as Football Club Legnano.

Several notable players appeared for Legnano in their early years. Goalkeeper Angelo Cameroni was called up to the Italian national side in 1920; he was the first Legnano player to achieve this. Luigi Allemandi played four seasons with the club from 1921 onwards, until he was bought by Italian giants Juventus. He later won the World Cup with Italy at the 1934 FIFA World Cup.

Serie A: Club at their peak
Legnano first gained access to Serie A for the 1930–31 season; the previous year they had finished as runners up in Serie B. The first match at the top level of Italian football was the shocking 2–1 defeat of Italy's oldest club, Genoa C.F.C.

Unfortunately for Legnano, they finished at the bottom of the table that season and were relegated; other notable results however were a 1–1 draw with eventual runners up A.S. Roma, and a 2–1 defeat of S.S.C. Napoli in Naples.

In the 1935–1936 season, the club changed their name to Associazione Calcio Legnano.

Left-winger Emilio Caprile was called up by the azzurri, to play in two international games during 1948. He became the first Legnano player to score for Italy with a goal in each match.

Slide down the Italian league

After their last relegation in from Serie A in 1953–54, the club have gradually declined. First they came close to promotion back into the league with a 3rd position in B, but two years later they were relegated down to Serie C.

Legnano spent 18 years in a row competing in Serie C, only able to finish as high as 5th in that time (they achieved this three times). 1974–75 saw the club slump down to Serie D; this was soon rectified as coach Luciano Sassi pulled the club back into Serie C2 with a runners up spot in 1977–78.

Giovanni Mari lifts Legnano
Giovanni Mari took over as club president in 1979 and under him, Legnano would achieve the championship of Serie C2. This was the first time A.C. Legnano had finished first position in any league since 1919. The club's stadium was later named Stadio Giovanni Mari in honour of the man.

The refoundation
Following bankruptcy in 2010, Legnano subsequently folded.

It was refounded on 15 July 2011, as A.S.D. Legnano Calcio 1913 and was admitted to Group N of Prima Categoria Lombardy in the 2011–12 season. The club was promoted to Group A of Promozione Lombardy.

The club had a successive second promotion after finishing as champions of Group A of Promozione Lombardy next season and was promoted to Group A of Eccellenza Lombardy.

On 7 May 2015, A.S.D. Legnano Calcio 1913 re-acquired the name Associazione Calcio Legnano. They finished Eccellenza Lombardy as 4th in 2014–15 but were eliminated in the play-offs. They finished Group A of Eccellanza Lombardy as 2nd and were qualified for the play-offs again. They defeated Torviscosa with 4–1 aggregate in semifinal and Sankt Georgen with 4–3 aggregate in final and were promoted to Serie D.

Players

Notable former players

 Luigi Allemandi
   Attilio Demaría
 Gigi Riva
 Nicholas Frey
 Pedro Kamata
 Karl-Erik Palmér
 Paolo Pulici
 Davide Fontolan
 Chedric Seedorf
 Marco Simone
 Hermann Lindemann

Staff

Presidential history
Over the years Legnano has had various owners, chairmen or presidential figures; here is a chronological list of the presidents;

 1913–1916  Aldo Visconti and Eugenio Tosi (honorary president)
 1917–1924  Antonio Bernocchi
 1924–1925  Carlo Delle Piane
 1925–1927  Ernesto Castiglioni
 1927–1929  Antonio Bernocchi
 1929–1931  Giuseppe Mario Perozzi, Mario Raimondo and Riccardo Pezzoni (board of regents)
 1931–1933  Ernesto Castiglioni
 1933–1934  Primo Colombo (extraordinary commissioner)
 1934–1945  Giulio Riva
 1945–1952  Pino Mocchetti
 1952–1953  Luigi Mandelli (extraordinary commissioner), following Giovanni Mari
 1953–1954  Giovanni Mari
 1954–1956  Giuseppe Mario Perozzi (extraordinary commissioner)
 1956–1959  Davide Casero (extraordinary commissioner)
 1959–1963  Luciano Caccia
 1963–1964  Felice Bossi (extraordinary commissioner)
 1964–1975  Augusto Terreni
 1975–1979  Rolando Landoni (extraordinary commissioner)
 1979–1986   Giovanni Mari
 1986  Ulrico Lucarelli
 1986–1987  Giovanni Mari
 1987–1996  Ferdinando Villa
 1996–1999  Mario Pighetti
 1999  Mauro Rusignolo
 1999–2002  Mauro Rusignolo
 2002–2005  Antonio Di Bari
 2005–2007  Giovanni Simone
 2007–2009  Giuseppe Resta
 2009–2010  Giacomo Tarabbia
 2010  Alessio Fiore
 2011–2015  Nicolò Zanda
 2015  Salvatore Verdoliva
 2015–incumbent  Vanessa Paolillo

Managerial history
Below is a list of AC Legnano coaches from 1913 until the present day:

 1913–1914  Adamo Bonacina
 1914–1915  Pariani
 1915–1916  Primo Colombo
 1916–1917  Primo Colombo
  Nino Resegotti
 1917–1919 Technical Committee:  Primo Colombo,  Adamo Bonacina and  Giuseppe Venegoni
 1919–1923  Primo Colombo
 1923–1925  Imre Schöffer
 1925–1927  Primo Colombo
 1927–1928  Imre Schöffer
 1928–1929  Armand Halmos
 1929–1931  Luigi Barbesino
 1931–1933  Otto Krappan
 1933–1934  Francesco Lattuada
  Vinicio Colombo
 1934–1935  Vinicio Colombo
 1935–1936  Enrico Crotti
 1936–1945  Enrico Crotti
 1945–1946  Attilio Demaria
 1946–1947  Róbert Winkler
 1947–1949  Giuseppe Galluzzi
 1949–1950  Ugo Innocenti
 1950–1951  Ugo Innocenti and   Héctor Puricelli
 1951–1952   Héctor Puricelli
 1952–1953  Ugo Innocenti
  Héctor Puricelli
 1953–1954  Giuseppe Galluzzi
 1954–1957  Ugo Innocenti
 1957–1959  Mario Zidarich
 1959–1960  Renato Picentini
 1960–1962  Giuseppe Molina
 1962–1963  Luciano Lupi
 1963–1964  Fausto Braga
 1964–1967  Luciano Lupi
 1967–1968  Carlo Facchini
 1968–1969  Sergio Realini
 1969–1970  Carlo Facchini
 1970–1971  Carlo Facchini
  Luciano Sassi
 1971–1973  Luciano Sassi
 1973–1974  Luciano Sassi
  Giovanni Visentin
 1974–1975  Fausto Braga
  Mario Trezzi
 1975–1979  Mario Trezzi
 1979–1980  Adelio Crespi
 1981–1983  Pietro Maroso
 1983–1984  Pietro Maroso
  Romualdo Capocci
 1984–1986  Andrea Valdinoci
 1986–1987  Giovanni Ardemagni
 1987–1988  Mauro Bicicli
 1989–1990  Giorgio Veneri
 1990–1991  Luciano Magistrelli
  Mauro Bicicli
 1991–1992  Abramo Rossetti
  Giancarlo Danova
 1992–1993  Marco Torresani
 1993–1995  Luigi Vallongo
 1995–1996  Renzo Contratto
  Giovanni Sacchi and Mauro Bicicli
 1996–1997  Loris Boni
 1997–1998  Carlo Muraro
 1998–1999  Gian Marco Remondina
 1999–2000  Roberto Bacchin
 2000–2001  Roberto Bacchin
  Carlo Muraro
  Ernestino Ramella
 2001–2002  Mario Belluzzo
  Ernestino Ramella
 2002–2003  Ernestino Ramella
  Angelo Gregucci
 2003–2004  Pierluigi Casiraghi
  Stefano Di Chiara
 2004–2005  Stefano Di Chiara
  Arcangelo Sciannimanico
  Giancarlo Oddi
 2005–2006  Vincenzo Maiuri and Gianpaolo Spagnulo
  Gianpaolo Spagnulo
  Luciano Miani
  Gianpaolo Spagnulo, and  Nicolas Gennarielli
 2006–2007  Gianfranco Motta
 2007–2008  Claudio Gabetta
  Egidio Notaristefano
 2008–2009  Attilio Lombardo
 2009–2010  Giuseppe Scienza
 2011–2013  Massimo Rovellini
 2013–2014  Massimo Rovellini
  Alessandro Cerri
 2014–incumbent  Stefano Di Gioia

Honours
Serie C2
Winners (2): 1982–1983 (group B), 2006–2007 (group A)

Campionato Nazionale Dilettanti
Winners: 1992–1993 (group A)

Serie D
Winners: 1999–2000 (group B)

Prima Categoria
Winners: 2011–2012 (group N)

Promozione
Winners: 2012–2013 (group A)

Prima Categoria:
Runners-up (2): 1919–1920 (group C), 1920–1921 (group D)

Prima Divisione:
Runners-up (2): 1922–1923 (group B), 1927–1928 (group B)

Serie B
Runners-up (3): 1946–1947 (group A), 1950–1951, 1952–1953

Serie D:
Runners-up (2): 1976–1977 (group B), 1977–1978 (group B)

Campionato Nazionale Dilettanti:
Runners-up: 1997–1998 (group B)

Eccellenza:
Runners-up: 2013–2014 (group A)

References

External links
 Official website
 Statistiche lilla

 
Football clubs in Italy
Football clubs in Lombardy
Association football clubs established in 1913
Association football clubs disestablished in 2010
Italian football First Division clubs
Serie A clubs
Serie B clubs
Serie C clubs
1913 establishments in Italy